ASFOSA Lomé is a Togolese football club based in Lomé. They play in the Togolese Second Division.

In 1966 the team has won the Togolese Championnat National.

Stadium
Their home stadium is Stade Agoè-Nyivé.

Achievements
Togolese Championnat National: 2
 1985, 1986

Performance in CAF competitions
 African Cup of Champions Clubs: 2 appearances
1986 African Cup of Champions Clubs: First Round
1987 African Cup of Champions Clubs: First Round

External links

References

Football clubs in Togo
Football clubs in Lomé